Rancho de los Californios is a former settlement in Fresno County, California. It was named after the Californios (Hispanic people from California).

Geography
It was located east of Pueblo de las Juntas on high ground near the south bank of the San Joaquin River.  Its site is near the corner of Ashlan and North Lake Avenues, 4miles north of the Whitesbridge Road and 6 miles west of Biola, California.

History
Located on the Eastern route of El Camino Viejo, the place was used as a hideout for horse thieves during Spanish and Mexican rule, and continued to be a place of relative safety for outlaws during the early years of American rule.

References

Former settlements in Fresno County, California
Former populated places in California
San Joaquin Valley